

"The customer is always right" is a motto or slogan which exhorts service staff to give a high priority to customer satisfaction.  It was popularised by pioneering and successful retailers such as Harry Gordon Selfridge, John Wanamaker and Marshall Field.  They advocated that customer complaints should be treated seriously so that customers do not feel cheated or deceived.  This attitude was novel and influential when misrepresentation was rife and caveat emptor (let the buyer beware) was a common legal maxim.  Variations include "le client n'a jamais tort" (the customer is never wrong) which was the slogan of hotelier César Ritz who said, "If a diner complains about a dish or the wine, immediately remove it and replace it, no questions asked". A variation frequently used in Germany is "der Kunde ist König" (the customer is king), while in Japan the motto "okyakusama wa kamisama desu" meaning "the customer is a god", is common.

It was pointed out as early as 1914 that this view ignores that customers can be dishonest, have unrealistic expectations or try to misuse a product in ways that void the guarantee.  "If we adopt the policy of admitting whatever claims the customer makes to be proper, and if we always settle them at face value, we shall be subjected to inevitable losses."  The work concluded "If the customer is made perfectly to understand what it means for him to be right, what right on his part is, then he can be depended on to be right if he is honest, and if he is dishonest, a little effort should result in catching him at it." An article a year later by the same author addressed the caveat emptor aspect while raising many of the same points as the earlier piece.

See also 
 The customer is not a moron

References

Further reading

 
 
 
 
 
 

Customer experience
Mottos
English phrases
Retail processes and techniques
19th-century neologisms